Simeon Georgaras (born 3 February 1973) is a Greek former water polo player who competed in the 1996 Summer Olympics.

References

1973 births
Living people
Greek male water polo players
Olympic water polo players of Greece
Water polo players at the 1996 Summer Olympics